Dr. James Welsey Tuttleton (August 19, 1934, St. Louis, Missouri – November 6, 1998) was the former Dean of the Faculty of Arts and Science and the Faculty of the English Department of New York University (NYU) and also served as Chairman of NYU's English Department and Associate Dean of the Graduate School.  He was one of the foremost literary critics of twentieth century, prominent especially as a "conservative" critic.

As an essayist on literature and culture and as a scholar of the work and the novel of manners, he earned international distinction. Tuttleton is deservedly known for his penetrating essays and solid positions he held regarding the literature's role and character.  Tuttleton was described in a New York Times review as “inveighing against everything from political correctness in the academy to those writers who would subordinate the imperatives of art to ideological considerations”, and also “curmudgeonly conservative”. Dr. Tuttleton described some contemporary critics as critical terrorists who would distort literature's meanings.

Dr. Tuttleton provided close critical readings of writers from Poe, Auchincloss, Henry James and Edith Wharton to Sinclair Lewis, Hemingway, Fitzgerald, Wright and Baldwin.  He authored the generally well regarded, provocatively entitled “The Primate’s Dream” concerning Black authors and literature.   Tuttleton was well known for his inspired teaching and wit. Dr. Tuttleton was also well known for his work for the New Criterion.

The James W. Tuttleton Fellowship Fund established in his honor accepts contributions sent to the English Department at New York University.

References

1934 births
1998 deaths
American literary critics
20th-century American non-fiction writers